Slovakia competed at the 1996 Summer Olympics in Atlanta, United States.
It was the first Summer Games since the dissolution of Czechoslovakia, and so the Czech Republic and Slovakia competed as independent teams.

Medalists

Athletics

Men
Track & road events

Field events

Women
Field events

Boxing

Canoeing

Slalom

Sprint
Men

Qualification Legend: 'R = Qualify to repechage; QS = Qualify to semi-final; QF = Qualify directly to final

Cycling

Road
Men

Women

Track

Mountain biking

Judo

Men

Gymnastics

Artistic
Women

Rowing

Men

Sailing
Men

M = Medal race; EL = Eliminated – did not advance into the medal race; CAN = Race cancelled

Shooting

Men

Swimming

Men

Women

Table tennis

Singles

Tennis

Men

Women

Weightlifting

Men

Wrestling

Men's freestyle

References
sports-reference

Nations at the 1996 Summer Olympics
1996
1996 in Slovak sport